The Aiguille de Triolet is a mountain on the eastern part the Mont Blanc massif, on the border between France and Italy.

Located on a long ridge that includes peaks such as Mont Dolent and Grandes Jorasses, the  Aiguille de Triolet lies above the Argentière Glacier and is usually climbed from this side, starting at Chamonix. Its north face is regarded as one of the classic ice climbs of the Alps.

See also

List of mountains of the Alps above 3000 m

References

Alpine three-thousanders
Mountains of the Graian Alps
Mountains of Haute-Savoie
Mountains of Aosta Valley
France–Italy border
International mountains of Europe
Mont Blanc massif